Marie Skurtveit Davidsen (born 20 August 1993) is a Norwegian handball player who plays for CSM București and the Norwegian national team.

References

1993 births
Living people
Norwegian female handball players
Norwegian expatriate sportspeople in Germany
Norwegian expatriate sportspeople in Romania
Sportspeople from Bergen